Taylor Fritz was the defending champion but lost in the third round to Mitchell Krueger.

Thai-Son Kwiatkowski won the title after defeating Daniel Elahi Galán 6–4, 6–1 in the final.

Seeds
All seeds receive a bye into the second round.

Draw

Finals

Top half

Section 1

Section 2

Bottom half

Section 3

Section 4

References

External links
Main draw
Qualifying draw

2020 ATP Challenger Tour
2020 Men's Singles